This is a list of Harlequin Romance novels released in 1959.

Releases

References 

Romance novels
Lists of novels
1959 novels